Scott Township, Illinois may refer to one of the following townships:

 Scott Township, Champaign County, Illinois
 Scott Township, Ogle County, Illinois

There is also:

 Scottville Township, Macoupin County, Illinois
 Scotland Township, McDonough County, Illinois

See also

Scott Township (disambiguation)

Illinois township disambiguation pages